Michael Corcoran (born December 9, 1972), known professionally as Backhouse Mike or Ken Lofkoll, is an American record producer, composer, and musician. He has composed songs for Nickelodeon's Drake & Josh, iCarly, Victorious, The Troop,Sam & Cat and Henry Danger, Disney Channel's Shake It Up and Liv and Maddie, Netflix's The Mr. Peabody & Sherman Show, and VH1's Hit the Floor.

Career 
From around 2003 to early 2010 he was a member of Drake Bell's band. His band Backhouse Mike, which consisted of lead singer and guitarist Jon Seminara, bassist John Charles Meyer, and keyboardist Kimberly Barnett appeared in the iCarly episode "iAm Your Biggest Fan" and the final episode of Zoey 101, "Chasing Zoey", using the name Backflesh. The band's song "Take Me Back" appears on the iCarly soundtrack.

Personal life
On August 8, 2020, Corcoran married actress Elizabeth Gillies at a private ceremony in New Jersey after the pair began dating in late 2012, having met each other on the Nickelodeon show Victorious.

Discography

Production discography

Awards and nominations

References

External links

American male singer-songwriters
Living people
Musicians from Los Angeles
Singer-songwriters from California
21st-century American singers
21st-century American male singers
1972 births